Fragrance oils, also known as aroma oils, aromatic oils, and flavor oils, are blended synthetic aroma compounds or natural essential oils that are diluted with a carrier like propylene glycol, vegetable oil, or mineral oil.

To allergic or otherwise sensitive people, synthetic fragrance oils are often less desirable than plant-derived essential oils as components of perfume. Essential oils, widely used in society, emit numerous volatile organic compounds (VOCs). Some of these VOCs are considered as potentially hazardous under federal regulations However, synthetic versions of the same compound as a natural essential oil are usually very comparable. Furthermore, natural oils are in many cases significantly more expensive than their synthetic equivalents.

Aromatic oils are used in perfumery, candles, cosmetics, flavoring of food.

Some include (out of a very diverse range):
 Ylang ylang
 Vanilla
 Sandalwood
 Cedar wood
 Mandarin orange
 Cinnamon
 Lemongrass
 Rosehip
 Peppermint

See also 
 Perfume
 Essential oil
 Aroma compound
 Fragrance allergy

References 

Essential oils
Perfume ingredients